The 1934 Campeonato Paulista was the 33rd season of São Paulo's top association football league. Two championships were disputed that season, each by a different league.

APEA Championship

In the edition organized by the APEA (Associação Paulista de Esportes Atléticos), Palestra Itália won the title for the 6th time. no teams were relegated and the top scorer was Palestra Itália's Romeu with 13 goals.

System
The championship was disputed in a double round-robin system, with the team with the most points winning the title.

Championship

FPF Championship

In the edition organized by the FPF (Federação Paulista de Football), which is not recognized by the present-day FPF as an official Paulista championship, Juventus, then playing under the name of Fiorentino, won the title for the 1st time. very little is known about that championship. The league folded soon after.

References

Campeonato Paulista seasons
Paulista